New Colony Six (sometimes abbreviated as NC6) is an American garage and later soft rock band from Chicago, formed in 1964.  Original members were Ray Graffia, Jr. (vocals), who was born March 28, 1946; Chic James (drums); Pat McBride (harmonica); Craig Kemp (organ); Wally Kemp (bass); and Gerry Van Kollenburg (guitar), who was born June 26, 1946. Ronnie Rice (vocals, keyboards, guitar) replaced Craig Kemp in 1966.  There were numerous changes in the lineup over the years.  Richie Unterberger characterized the group's sound as "a poppier American Them with their prominent organ, wobbly Lesley-fied guitar amplifications, and rave-up tempos", later devolving into "a cabaret-ish band with minor national hits to their credit by the end of the 1960s."  Like Paul Revere & the Raiders - with whom NC6 shared a two-flat before either band hit the charts or knew that the other had nearly identical stage wear, they wore colonial outfits on stage.

In late 1964, when New Colony Six (from St. Patrick's High School on Chicago's northwest side, and at about 18 years average age) were passed over by Columbia Records and Dick Clark Productions in favor of Paul Revere and the Raiders for the ABC network TV show Where the Action Is, the father of one of the group members, Ray Graffia, Sr., along with other parents who agreed to help on costs, paid for the recording studio work on the group's first single, "I Confess", founded the group's record label Centaur (later changed to Sentaur and then finally, Sentar).  Group was self-managed at the time, later turning to Pete Wright & Howard Bedno, who were active in the promotion of artists in the recording industry at the time. The group's first album, Breakthrough, on Centaur Records, followed in early 1966. The band's record distribution was picked up by Cameo-Parkway Records, and their record label changed from Centaur to Sentar on their next album, 1967's Colonization, which included the single "Love You So Much". In late 1967, with the acquisition of Ronnie Rice and a new contract with Mercury Records, the band's recorded presence stepped back from their regional and live concert garage rock image and sound and was promoted by Mercury Records as a "soft rock" band.

The group's height of popularity occurred between 1966 and 1971, when their ten singles were on the Hot 100.  New Colony Six scored their first major local hit in Chicago with "I Confess" (WLS #2 on 4 February 1966, Hot 100 #80 on 5-12 March 1966), featured on their debut album, Breakthrough, followed almost a year later by "Love You So Much" (WLS #2 on 27 January 1967, Hot 100 #61 on 25 March 1967, #49 Canada).  Ellery Temple briefly joined in 1967, replacing Wally Kemp, and was subsequently replaced by Les Kummel (who died in an auto accident in Chicago on 18 December 1978 at age 33).

The band's two biggest hits, which peaked on the Chicago-area radio station WLS months before they peaked nationally, were Rice's "I Will Always Think About You" (WLS #1 on 25 March 1968, Hot 100 #22 on 1 June 1968, #14 RPM Canada) and "Things I'd Like to Say" (WLS #2 on 30 December 1968, Hot 100 #16 on 22–29 March 1969, #6 Canada), followed by "I Could Never Lie To You" (WLS #7 on 26 May - 2 June 1969, Hot 100 #50 on 14 June 1969, #38 Canada).  Billy Herman (vocals, drums) replaced James in 1969.  Graffia left in 1969, returning later and still remains a part of the band in 2022-23.  Chuck Jobes (keyboards) replaced Craig Kemp when Kemp left while Bruce Gordon (bass) joined the band following Kummel's death. 

None of the group's last four Hot 100 entries, from late summer 1969 to New Year's Day 1972, reached the top 55.  Skip Griparis was playing guitar and singing lead vocals in 1972 until the band's initial cessation to performing at the end of 1974.

In 1988, the band played a reunion show at Chicago's Park West and has remained in concert performances ever since --- this being updated at the end of 2022, but with contracts already in place into Q4, 2023!  The group, in part, also currently participates in The Cornerstones of Rock concert series, along with four other famous Chicagoland Mid '60's garage rock bands, The Buckinghams, The Shadows of Knight (from Prospect High School), The Cryan' Shames (from Hinsdale South High School) and The Ides of March (from J. Sterling Morton West High School, Berwyn, Illinois).  NC6ers include Graffia, Rice and Bruce Mattey.

As of Q4, 2022, the band continues to perform with founding member Graffia and Bruce Mattey in the lineup.  New Colony Six was inducted into the Iowa Rock n' Roll Music Association Hall of Fame in 2002 and the Illinois Rock & Roll Hall of Fame in 2022.

Discography

Albums
Breakthrough (1966, Centaur)
Colonization (1967, Sentar)
Revelations (1968, Mercury)
Attacking a Straw Man (1969, Mercury)
Colonized!: the Best of New Colony Six (1993 Compilation, Rhino)
At the River's Edge (1993 Compilation, Sundazed records)
A Live and Well (2005 The Colony Live)

Singles

References

External links
Official website
Iowa Rock n' Roll Music Association Hall of Fame

Ronnie Rice

Musical groups from Chicago
Musical groups established in 1965
Musical groups disestablished in 1974
Mercury Records artists